Jens Höing (born February 21, 1987 in Münster) is a German racing driver.

Career

Formula BMW
After a five-year karting career, Höing moved up into the Formula BMW ADAC championship via a scholarship. Driving for Team Rosberg, Höing scored 2 points in 2005, but stayed in the series for 2006, but changed teams to GU-Racing. He improved from 23rd in 2005 to 14th in 2006, but still didn't crack the higher echelons of the standings, only amassing thirteen points. A new points system was introduced in 2007, which meant that Höing scored over 200 points but yet remained in 14th place overall. He competed at the end of season World Final in Valencia in 2006, and finished in 18th place.

Formula Three
After his three seasons in FBMW, Höing moved up into the German Formula Three Championship in 2008 but continued with GU-Racing. Höing finished in the points once, at the Nürburgring as he came out in 17th in the championship.

Formula Two
Höing originally signed up to drive in the 2009 FIA Formula Two Championship, driving car number twenty. However, some contractual issues forced Höing to remove himself from the championship. Once they were rectified, Höing returned to the championship, and was also reinstated to his original car number, after Edoardo Piscopo had used it at the first group test at Snetterton. It also forced organisers MotorSport Vision to increase the field to 25. He finished 26th in the standings, with no points. Höing was frequently involved in racing incidents, failing to finish in ten of the sixteen races.

Racing record

Career summary

Complete FIA Formula Two Championship results
(key) (Races in bold indicate pole position) (Races in italics indicate fastest lap)

References

External links
 Official website
 Career statistics from Driver Database

1987 births
Living people
German racing drivers
German Formula Three Championship drivers
FIA Formula Two Championship drivers
Formula BMW ADAC drivers
Sportspeople from Münster
Racing drivers from North Rhine-Westphalia
People with chronic fatigue syndrome
Team Rosberg drivers
21st-century German people